The Stade de la Mosson is a football stadium in Montpellier, France. It is the home of Ligue 1 club Montpellier HSC, and has a capacity of 32,900. Formerly a 16,000-seater stadium, it was entirely rebuilt in 1998 to host 6 games of the 1998 FIFA World Cup. It was also used as a venue for group stage matches in the 2007 Rugby World Cup, and was one of nine venues used in the 2019 FIFA Women's World Cup.

The stadium takes its name from the neighbouring Mosson river.

Football
In October 2014, the stadium flooded twice as over 30 centimeters (12 inches) of rain fell in Montpellier. The stadium and pitch were damaged, and this resulted in Montpellier HSC relocating for 5 fixtures during the 2014–15 season (4 Ligue 1 matches and 1 Coupe de la Ligue match) to the Altrad Stadium, until repairs had been made to the stadium. The relocation lasted for the remainder of 2014, the first fixture on 28 October, and the last being 13 December. The flooding caused Montpellier to cancel their 40-year anniversary celebration.

1998 FIFA World Cup
The stadium was one of the venues for the 1998 FIFA World Cup. The following games were played at the stadium during the 1998 World Cup:

2019 FIFA Women's World Cup
The stadium was one of the venues for the 2019 FIFA Women's World Cup. It hosted four group games and one Round of 16 match; among them were the Australia vs Brazil game – a match that was notable for witnessing the first goals conceded by Brazil in the group stage in 16 years as well as Brazil's first group stage loss for 24 years.

Rugby union 

The stadium was one of the venues for the 2007 Rugby World Cup.

The stadium hosted a semi-final game in the 2012–13 Heineken Cup between Clermont and Munster on 27 April 2013.

Rugby league 
On Saturday 9 June 2012, the stadium hosted rugby league for the first time. The Catalans Dragons will continue their policy of playing some home games away from the Stade Gilbert Brutus, Perpignan by playing their Stobart Super League fixture against Wigan Warriors at the stadium. This will be the second time the fixture has been played in Montpellier with the previous year's game being held in the Stade Yves-du-Manoir.

References

External links
Stadium Guide Article
World Stadium Article

Mosson
1998 FIFA World Cup stadiums
Sports venues in Montpellier
Buildings and structures in Montpellier
Montpellier HSC
Mossan
Sports venues completed in 1972
Tourist attractions in Montpellier
2019 FIFA Women's World Cup stadiums